Dempster Brothers, Inc. of Knoxville, Tennessee, was an industrial firm that made waste handling vehicles including the Dempster Dumpmaster and Dempster Dinosaur. The firm was originally established by George Roby Dempster with his brothers Thomas and John Dempster. The company is notable for popularizing the word dumpster, which eventually became a generic trademark.

Dempster Dumpmaster
The Dempster Dumpmaster, introduced in the 1950s, was the first commercially successful, front-loading garbage truck in the United States. The product uses the Dempster-Dumpster system of mechanically emptying standardized metal containers, which had been patented by the company in 1937. It had arms at the front that picked up a dumpster and lifted it over the cab to tip it into the hopper. A rearward-traveling compacting panel compressed the garbage stored in the truck and was also used to push it out through a door at the back when it was being emptied.

See also
Garwood Load Packer

References

External links

 ClassicRefuseTrucks.com

 Blue Star Dumpsters

Waste collection vehicles
Waste management companies of the United States
Companies based in Knoxville, Tennessee